Mangles may refer to several things and people, mostly related to the one family:

People
Mangles family
James Mangles (MP) (1762–1838), English merchant and politician
James Mangles (Royal Navy officer) (1786–1867), FRS, explorer and botanist
Ross Mangles (1833–1905), recipient of the Victoria Cross

Others
Mangles Bay, Western Australia
Mangles River,  South Island, New Zealand

See also
 Mangle (disambiguation)